Euchorium is monospecific genus of plants in the family Sapindaceae. The only species, Euchorium cubense is endemic to Cuba. It has not been relocated since its discovery despite several searches, and is thus considered extinct.

References

Endemic flora of Cuba
Monotypic Sapindaceae genera
Dodonaeoideae
Taxonomy articles created by Polbot
Extinct flora of North America
Plant extinctions since 1500